Ömie (Aomie) is a language of Papua New Guinea. Half of speakers are monolingual.

External links 
 Paradisec have a collection of Ömie recordings.

References 

Languages of Papua New Guinea
Koiarian languages